"Beautiful Mess" is a song written by Shane Minor, Clay Mills and Exile bassist Sonny LeMaire, and recorded by American country music group Diamond Rio.  It was released in April 2002 as the first single from Diamond Rio's album Completely.  The song reached Number One on the Billboard Hot Country Singles & Tracks (now Hot Country Songs) charts, a position that it held for two non-consecutive weeks.  The song was also Diamond Rio's most successful crossover single, peaking at number 28 on the US Billboard Hot 100.

Content

The song is a mid-tempo in which the narrator describes how his life has changed since he fell in love. He describes himself as "going out of [his] mind" and unable to concentrate — for example, appearing tired at work, accidentally putting salt in his coffee, "walkin' 'round in a haze", and "put[ting] [his] shoes on the wrong feet". Ultimately, he calls his state of mind a "beautiful mess".

Critical reception
Chuck Taylor, of Billboard magazine reviewed the song favorably saying that "reverb-drenched guitar, a smoldering melody, and the barely contained pathos in the vocal highlight this next slice of excellence." Taylor said the "well-rendered backup vocals" and the good production give depth to the song.

Music video
The music video was directed by Deaton Flanigen and premiered on CMT on May 31, 2002. It was filmed at the Nashville International Airport.

Charts
"Beautiful Mess" debuted at number 55 on the U.S. Billboard Hot Country Singles & Tracks chart for the week of April 13, 2002. "Beautiful Mess" reached its peak of number one on the Hot Country Singles & Tracks chart on the chart week of September 28, 2002. One week later, it fell to the number-two position. "Beautiful Mess" then returned to the number one spot on the chart dated for October 12, accounting for a second and final week in that peak.

Year-end charts

References

2002 singles
Country ballads
2000s ballads
Diamond Rio songs
Songs written by Shane Minor
Songs written by Clay Mills
Music videos directed by Deaton-Flanigen Productions
Arista Nashville singles
Songs written by Sonny LeMaire
2002 songs